Chiloglanis lukugae is a species of upside-down catfish endemic to the Democratic Republic of the Congo where it is found in the Luvua River drainage.  Reports from other locations need confirmation. This species grows to a length of  SL.

References

External links 

lukugae
Freshwater fish of Africa
Fish of the Democratic Republic of the Congo
Endemic fauna of the Democratic Republic of the Congo
Fish described in 1944